The Battle of Durrës was one of the main confrontations during the April 1939 Italian invasion of Albania. It took place on 7 April, the first day of the invasion, between the Italian invaders and the Albanian defenders and resulted in an Italian victory.

Opposing forces
The Italian Armed Forces committed 22,000 troops under General Alfredo Guzzoni to the invasion of Albania. The main force, tasked with capturing the capital Tirana, was placed under the command of General Alfredo Guzzoni and was to be landed at Durrës; it consisted of two battalions of the 3rd Regiment "Grenadiers of Sardinia", one battalion of the 47th Infantry Regiment, five Bersaglieri battalions (two belonging to the 2nd Bersaglieri Regiment and one each from the 3rd Bersaglieri Regiment, 7th Bersaglieri Regiment, and 11th Bersaglieri Regiment), two battalions of L3/35 tankettes, one 65/17 mm battery and one 20/65 anti-aircraft battery, all under the command of General Giovanni Messe.

The Albanian defenders consisted of one Frontier Guard battalion, one Albanian Army battalion, a platoon of marines of the Royal Albanian Navy, and Engineer company, a mountain battery with two 75/13 mm guns (overall, 360 soldiers and 140 marines according to Albanian sources) as well as numerous volunteers armed only with small arms. The defenders were led by the commander of the Durrës Gendarmerie, Major Abaz Kupi, and Major Alibali of the Albanian Army. The "Prandaj" coastal battery (commanded by Major Gaqe Jorgo), armed with four 75/27 mm Škoda guns, supported the defenders, whose main armament otherwise consisted of rifles and three Schwarzlose machine guns. The four patrol boats which made up the Royal Albanian Navy were armed mainly with one 76 mm gun apiece when they were commissioned in 1926. However, at the time of the Italian invasion, their armament was reduced to one obsolete machine gun, as their main guns were landed to form a coastal battery on a nearby hill, overlooking Durrës.

Battle

The Italian warships arrived near Durrës in the afternoon of 6 April, whereas the transports carrying the landing forces arrived at 4:50 in the morning of April 7, with a 30-minute delay caused by the fog. Before the attack, a boat with twenty Italian officers was sent ashore, but the Albanians refused to grant them passage. An exchange of fire followed, and thus the battle ensued; the landing of the Italian force commenced at 5:25. 
Italian marines and troops disembarked and advanced in close formation, not expecting any resistance, as the town was illuminated and there seemed to be no sign of reaction. However, when the troops disembarked on the piers they were greeted by a barrage of rifle and machine gun fire by the defenders, lying in wait among the nearby harbour buildings, causing many casualties. A second Italian landing was carried out soon afterwards, with a greater number of troops. The Albanian defenders, however, took positions closer to the concrete breakwater of the harbor and waited for all Italians to disembark, then again opened fire with the machine guns. The third attack was successful, being supported by naval gunfire from the Italian warships; overall, fighting went on for a few hours, including in some cases hand-to-hand combat, and in the end the Albanian defenders began to fall back. By nine o'clock in the morning, all of Durrës was in Italian hands, after the Italians landed numerous small tanks and armored cars from one of their warships.    
The Albanian coastal battery was also active during the battle, shelling Italian positions. In the last hour of the battle, naval sergeant Mujo Ulqinaku, one of the three Albanian machine gunners, was killed by a shell from an Italian warship.

Aftermath

The Albanians lost 51 men in the battle; Italian casualties are recorded as 25 killed and 97 wounded, although the Albanian side claims that Italian casualties were higher (up to 400 according to some claims). The four patrol boats of the Royal Albanian Navy were captured by the Italians, as was the coastal battery. The fighting in Durrës saw the heaviest resistance encountered by any of the Italian landing forces in Albania. From Durrës, the Italian force marched towards Tirana, that was captured on the following day.

References

Battles involving Albania
Battles involving Italy
Naval battles involving Italy
Conflicts in 1939
1939 in Italy
1939 in Albania
Military history of Italy during World War II
Royal Albanian Army
Albania–Italy military relations
Invasions of Albania